The 1978 Brown Bears football team was an American football team that represented Brown University during the 1978 NCAA Division I-A football season. Brown tied for second place in the Ivy League. 

In their fourth season under head coach John Anderson, the Bears compiled a 6–3 record and outscored opponents 189 to 165. N. Jacob and M. Whipple were the team captains. 

The Bears' 6–3 conference record tied for second-best in the Ivy League standings. They outscored Ivy opponents 155 to 123. 

Brown played its home games at Brown Stadium in Providence, Rhode Island.

Schedule

References

Brown
Brown Bears football seasons
Brown Bears football